Paula's Home Cooking is a Food Network show hosted by Paula Deen.  Deen's primary culinary focus was Southern cuisine and familiar comfort food that is popular with Americans. In the show, classic dishes such as pot roast, fried okra, fried chicken and pecan pie were the norm, and overcomplicated or eccentric recipes were usually eschewed.  Dishes that are flavorful and familiar were spotlighted, although the fat content and calorie count of the meals were often very high.  Paula also showed off vignettes of Savannah, Georgia, where she co-owns The Lady & Sons with her sons Jamie and Bobby.

Deen's popularity, spurred by the show, led to a small role in the feature film Elizabethtown.

Despite its possibly Southern atmosphere, Paula's Home Cooking was taped in upstate New York until 2006; since then, shows had been taped at Deen's new home near Savannah. In 2008, Deen began work on a revamped version of the series called Paula's Best Dishes, in which friends and family join her in the kitchen to prepare recipes.  Deen's sons often appeared as guests on the show.  They too proved to be popular among Food Network's audience and now have their own show, Road Tasted, similar to Rachael Ray's Tasty Travels. Deen's husband, Michael Groover, also appeared sporadically as a guest, and Food Network taped the Deen-Groover wedding in 2004 as a special edition of the show. The success of Paula's Home Cooking led to a line of cookbooks, a magazine, other television shows and specials, and related merchandise. Reruns of the show now air on Food Network's sister channel GAC.

On June 21, 2013, the Food Network announced that they would not renew Deen's contract due to controversy surrounding Deen's use of a racial slur made 30 years earlier, effectively cancelling the series.

References

External links
 
 Paula's Home Cooking on The Food Network
  The Lady and Sons Restaurant in Savannah Georgia

2002 American television series debuts
2012 American television series endings
2000s American cooking television series
2010s American cooking television series
Food Network original programming
Television shows set in New York (state)
Television shows set in Georgia (U.S. state)
English-language television shows